Jamir Malik Miller (born November 19, 1973) is a former American college and professional football player who was a linebacker in the National Football League (NFL) for nine seasons.  He played college football for the University of California, Los Angeles (UCLA), and received All-American honors.  A first-round pick in the 1994 NFL Draft, he played professionally for the Arizona Cardinals and Cleveland Browns of the NFL.

Early years
Miller was born in Philadelphia, Pennsylvania.  He graduated from El Cerrito High School in El Cerrito, California, where he played for the El Cerrito Gauchos high school football team.

College career
Miller attended UCLA, where he played for the UCLA Bruins football team from 1991 through 1993.  As a junior in 1993, he was recognized as a consensus first-team All-American, after which he decided to forgo his final year of college eligibility and enter the NFL Draft.  He finished his college career with 35 tackles for loss and 23.5 quarterback sacks.

Professional career

Miller retired from the Cleveland Browns following the 2002 season after suffering a season-ending injury, a ruptured Achilles Tendon. Up until 2007 he was the only Browns player to be selected to the Pro Bowl since the team re-entered the NFL in 1999. In 2007 seven Browns players were nominated to the 2008 Pro Bowl.

Miller was one of four linebackers selected to the Associated Press All-Pro team in 2001. (The other 3 were Jason Gildon, Brian Urlacher, and Ray Lewis.)

Miller was carted off the field after tearing his right Achilles tendon in a 27–15 preseason victory over the Minnesota Vikings to start the 2002 pre-season.  He was placed on injured reserve August 13, 2002, but the severity of his injury led to him being waived on February 22, 2003, the end of the 2002 campaign. Afterwards he retired.

References

1973 births
Living people
All-American college football players
American Conference Pro Bowl players
American football linebackers
Arizona Cardinals players
Cleveland Browns players
UCLA Bruins football players
Ed Block Courage Award recipients